John Stewart, 1st Earl of Lennox (before 14308 July/11 September 1495) was known as Lord Darnley and later as the Earl of Lennox.

Family
Stewart was the son of Catherine Seton and Alan Stewart of Darnley, a direct descendant of Alexander Stewart, 4th High Steward of Scotland. His paternal grandmother was the daughter and co-heiress of Donnchadh, Earl of Lennox. Through his mother he was also a descendant of Thomas Randolph, 1st Earl of Moray, nephew of King Robert I of Scotland. Through his son Matthew Stewart, 2nd Earl of Lennox, Stewart was the great-great-great-grandfather of Henry Stuart, Lord Darnley, husband of his first cousin Mary, Queen of Scots and father of James VI, King of Scotland, who became James I, King of England. Stewart's descendants have held the English throne ever since James I, as well as the royal houses of several European monarchies.

Political career
As head of the powerful family of Stewart of Darnley he was created Governor of Rothesay Castle in 1465 and appointed Warden of the West Marches of Scotland. When the male line of the Earldom of Lennox became extinct he was heir to half of the lands and made a deal with the co-heir in which he was made Earl of Lennox in 1473. The succession was disputed by John of Haldane, who claimed succession through descent from Duncan, 8th earl. Darnley, however, prevailed and his right to the earldom was not disputed for the last seven years of his life.

He was a loyal ally of James III during his war against the rebel lords led by Archibald Douglas, 5th Earl of Angus. After the death of the King at the Battle of Sauchieburn and the coronation of his underage son James IV he raised an army to fight against the rebel lords who now controlled the government. The rebels had seized control of Edinburgh Castle and now had possession of the important royal artillery. Included in the arsenal of Edinburgh Castle was the cannon Mons Meg which had been a wedding gift from Philip the Good, Duke of Burgundy to the King of Scots a generation earlier. Using this weapon they laid siege to Crookston Castle, seat of the Stewarts of Darnley, forcing the Earl of Lennox to surrender.

After his surrender he was allowed to keep his lands and they passed to his eldest son Matthew Stewart, 2nd Earl of Lennox who was one of the leaders of the Scottish army killed at the Battle of Flodden.

Marriage
John Stewart's marriage has been a source of genealogical confusion. He is recorded as having contracted to marry Margaret Montgomerie, the daughter of Alexander Montgomerie, 1st Lord Montgomerie and Margaret Boyd, by indenture on 15 May 1438, as both parties were under age. She, however, appears to have died young. Ultimately, he married another Margaret Montgomerie in 1460, who was not the same individual, but the fraternal niece of the former, who was the daughter of Alexander, Master of Montgomerie (son of the 1st Lord), and Elizabeth Hepburn. John had by Margaret Montgomerie eight recorded children:

Sons
Matthew Stewart, 2nd Earl of Lennox (14609 Sep 1513), eldest son and heir, killed at the Battle of Flodden;
Sir Robert Stewart, 5th Seigneur d'Aubigny (1470–1544)
Sir John Stewart, Seigneur d'Oison (before 1474c. 1512)
Sir William Stewart, Seigneur d'Oison (before 1495before 1504)
Alexander Stewart (before 1495before 1509)

Daughters
Lady Marion Stewart
Lady Elizabeth Stuart (born 1464), married Archibald Campbell, 2nd Earl of Argyll.
Lady Elizabeth Stewart (born before 1476), married Sir John Colquhoun of Luss, Dumbartonshire.

Ancestors

References 

G. E. Cokayne et al., The Complete Peerage of England, Scotland, Ireland, Great Britain and the United Kingdom, Extant, Extinct, or Dormant. (Gloucester, U.K.: Alan Sutton, 2000) I:313, 328; VII:594, 596.
Charles Mosley, ed., Burke's Peerage, Baronetage, and Knightage. 107th ed. 3 vols. (Wilmington, DE: Burke's Peerage (Genealogical Books) Ltd., 2003) I:601.

Stewart, John, 1st Earl
John
1495 deaths
Year of birth unknown
15th-century Scottish peers